Bonamia menziesii, commonly known as Hawaii lady's nightcap, is a species of flowering plant in the morning glory family, Convolvulaceae, that is endemic to Hawaii. It is a vine or twisting liana with branches that can reach  in length.

Scattered populations exist on most main islands, but the total number of individuals remaining is probably fewer than 1000.

The plant is threatened by habitat loss. Habitat has been destroyed or degraded by development, fires, exotic plant species, and agriculture. Military exercises damage part of the critical habitat on Oahu. Feral pigs, goats, cattle, sheep and deer eat the plant and trample the habitat. The non-native sweet potato bug (Physomerus grossipes) has been noted to feed on the plant.

References

menziesii
Endemic flora of Hawaii
Critically endangered plants
NatureServe critically imperiled species
Taxonomy articles created by Polbot